The Shire of Laidley was a local government area located in the Lockyer Valley region between the cities of Toowoomba and Ipswich, and about  west of Brisbane, the state capital of Queensland, Australia.

History

Prior to European settlement, the area around Laidley was home to the Kitabul Aboriginal people. Today, the Ugarapul People are considered the traditional owners of the Lockyer Valley region.

The district initially became part of the Tarampa Divisional Board, which was created on 15 January 1880 under the Divisional Boards Act 1879 in the colony of Queensland. On 25 April 1888, the Laidley district broke away and separately incorporated as the Laidley Division, and on 25 January 1890, the Forest Hill area moved from Tarampa to Laidley. On 1 July 1902, the town of Laidley was created as a separate municipality with its own Borough Council. With the passage of the Local Authorities Act 1902, the borough became a Town and the division a Shire on 31 March 1903. In 1917, Laidley Shire Council II was created with the amalgamation of Laidley Town Council, Laidley Shire Council I, and part of the Shire of Rosewood. On 15 March 2008, under the Local Government (Reform Implementation) Act 2007 passed by the Parliament of Queensland on 10 August 2007, Laidley merged with the Shire of Gatton to form the Lockyer Valley Region.

Structure
The Shire of Laidley initially had three divisions each electing three councillors, but from 1917 onwards had five divisions each electing two councillors. The chairman and clerk were chosen from amongst the councillors.

Towns and localities
The Shire of Laidley included the following settlements:

 Laidley
 Blenheim
 Forest Hill
 Glenore Grove
 Regency Downs
 Hatton Vale
 Kentville
 Laidley Heights
 Lockrose
 Mulgowie
 Plainland

Population

Chairmen and mayors

1905: Philip McGrath
1927: Andreas Schlecht
1930: Thomas Cornelius Hayes
1935: Thomas Cornelius Hayes
 1970–1973: William Angus (Bill) Gunn
 1997–2008: Shirley Pitt

References

Further reading

External links
 

Laidley
1888 establishments in Australia
2008 disestablishments in Australia
Populated places disestablished in 2008